Lauren Walker (born 12 March 1989) is an English footballer who usually plays at either left-back or left midfield. She previously represented Blackburn Rovers Ladies in the FA Women's Premier League National Division. She hails from Birches Head, Staffordshire.

Club career
Walker played as a junior for Port Vale Girls and Stoke City Girls and as a senior for Wolves Women in the Northern Premiership before joining Arsenal Ladies' reserve side. She left Arsenal to join Blackburn Rovers Ladies in July 2009. Her first goal for Rovers came in their 4–2 Women's FA Cup first round win at home to Manchester City Ladies.

International career
Walker was selected as a member of the Great Britain women's football squad for the World University Games in Belgrade in 2009. She played in each of the side's previous three games, but was an unused substitute as Britain lost on penalties to Japan in the semi-final. The side eventually won the Bronze Medal after beating France in the third-place play-off match.

Personal life
Walker was a Sports and Exercise Science student at the University of Hertfordshire.

Statistics
To 28 October 2009

References

1989 births
Living people
English women's footballers
Arsenal W.F.C. players
Blackburn Rovers L.F.C. players
FA Women's National League players
Women's association football midfielders
Stoke City L.F.C. players
Wolverhampton Wanderers W.F.C. players
Universiade bronze medalists for Great Britain
Universiade medalists in football
Alumni of the University of Hertfordshire
Footballers from Stoke-on-Trent
Medalists at the 2009 Summer Universiade